The 2012–13 Cal State Fullerton Titans men's basketball team represented California State University, Fullerton during the 2012–13 NCAA Division I men's basketball season. The Titans, led by first year interim head coach Andy Newman, played their home games at Titan Gym and were members of the Big West Conference. They finished the season 14–18, 6–12 in Big West play to finish in eighth place. They lost in the quarterfinals of the Big West tournament to Long Beach State.

Coach Newman wouldn't be retained for the 2013–14 season. Instead he became the new head coach at the University of Texas of the Permian Basin.

Roster

Schedule

|-
!colspan=9| Exhibition

|-
!colspan=9| Regular season

|-
!colspan=9| 2013 Big West Conference men's basketball tournament

References

Cal State Fullerton Titans men's basketball seasons
Cal State Fullerton
Fullerton Titans
Fullerton Titans